Sir Peter James Torry  (born 2 August 1948) is a former British diplomat who was the UK Ambassador to Germany from 2003 until 30 September 2007. He is now a senior adviser to Cairn Capital and to STAR Capital Partners.  He is on the Supervisory Board of Blohm and Voss AG.  He is a member of the advisory board of Betfair plc and of the Kiel Global Economic Symposium and a policy fellow of the Institute on the Future of Employment in Bonn.  He was a member of the advisory panel of Lloyds Pharmacy until April 2010 and a senior adviser to DAM Capital until December 2009, to Centrica plc until 2012 and to Celesio AG. He was educated at Dover College and at New College, Oxford, to which he won an Open Scholarship. At Oxford he won a blue for Rugby in 1968 and 1969, when the University beat the touring Springboks.  He was subsequently selected for the President’s of the Rugby Union  XV against Wales  

He was previously Ambassador to Spain from 1998–2003 and has also worked for the Foreign and Commonwealth Office in Washington DC, Bonn, Jakarta and Cuba.

He enjoys antiques, golf, reading, walking and travelling.

He is married and has three daughters, Emma, Harriet and Katherine Torry.

References

1948 births
Knights Grand Cross of the Royal Victorian Order
Knights Commander of the Order of St Michael and St George
Living people
People educated at Dover College
Alumni of New College, Oxford
Ambassadors of the United Kingdom to Spain
Ambassadors of the United Kingdom to Germany